Garden Court Apartments may refer to:

Garden Court Apartments (Los Angeles, California)
Garden Court Apartments (Detroit, Michigan)